Kristin Minde (born 27 July 1982) is a Norwegian pop singer and musician.

Early life
Minde was born in Oslo, Norway, and raised in Frekhaug north of Bergen. She began playing the piano at home in Frekhaug when she was five years old.

Career 
Minde was a member of the vocal group "Nardus" performing in the NRK program "Absolutt norsk" (Absolutely Norwegian) in 2002 and 2003, with Rune Larsen as a program host, and the six girls appeared as soloists and choir. Nardus released in the disc Uncovered in 2002.

After having released her debut solo album Six Feet Over (2011), the music was defined as "melodic, maximalist musical pop". This seems like an apt description also for her second album, The Weight (2013). It is largely magnificent and somewhat bombastic pop music, which Minde communicates with strong empathy and good tune flair.

In 2018, she released her first album in Norwegian, Hjerteslag.

Discography

Solo albums
2011: Six Feet Over (Voices of Wonder)
2013: The Weight (Voices of Wonder)
2018: Hjerteslag (Grammofon AS)
2019: Vinterrosen (Grammofon AS)
2021: Alle slags dager del 1 (Grammofon AS)
2022: Alle slags dager del 2 (Grammofon AS)

Collaborations
2002: Uncovered, Nardus (Plush Badgers records)

References

 https://www.vl.no/kultur/menneskelig-mindesmerke-1.1127496?paywall=expired

External links

Kristin Minde on the NRK program Urørt

Norwegian pop singers
Norwegian women pianists
Norwegian pop musicians
Norwegian composers
1982 births
Living people
People from Nordhordland
21st-century Norwegian singers
21st-century Norwegian women singers
21st-century pianists
21st-century women pianists